John McKeown is an English musician.

John McKeown may also refer to:
John McKeown (rugby league) (1926–2006), English rugby player
John McKeown (footballer) (born 1981), Scottish footballer 
Jackie McKeown (John McKeown, born 1971), Scottish singer with The Yummy Fur
John McKeown (Brooklyn) (born 1855), member of the 118th New York State Legislature